Samuel Bernard Goodwyn (born February 23, 1961) is the chief justice of the Supreme Court of Virginia. He previously served as a circuit court judge in Chesapeake.

Early life and education 

A Southampton County native, Goodwyn graduated magna cum laude from Harvard University with a bachelor's degree in economics in 1983. He received his Juris Doctor from the University of Virginia’s School of Law in 1986, where he was an editor for the Virginia Tax Review, a member of the Raven Society, and received the Ritter Award for honor, character and integrity.

Legal, academic and judicial career 

Prior to his appointment to the bench, Goodwyn practiced law at the law firm of Willcox & Savage.

From 1997 until his appointment to the Supreme Court, Goodwyn was a judge in the First Judicial Circuit Court in Chesapeake, Virginia. Prior to being named to the circuit court, he served two years as a district court judge. Goodwyn also served on the faculty of the University of Virginia School of Law during the 1994–95 school year as a research associate professor of law.

Virginia Supreme Court 
On October 10, 2007, Goodwyn was appointed to the Supreme Court of Virginia by Governor Tim Kaine to fill the vacancy created by the retirement of Justice Elizabeth B. Lacy early in 2007. In the 2008 session of the Virginia General Assembly, a political standoff between the Democratic-controlled Senate and the Republican-controlled House of Delegates resulted in Goodwyn's nomination being put on hold until February 8, 2008, the day the pro tempore appointment would have expired. On that day the General Assembly unanimously appointed Goodwyn to a 12-year term. In January 2020, he was reappointed to another 12-year term, set to expire in 2032. He became chief justice on January 1, 2022.

References

External links
Richmond Times Dispatch Online Article on the Legislative deadlock
Virginia Lawyers Weekly Blog post reporting election 
Virginian-Pilot Article on Goodwyn's First Judicial Appointment

|-

1961 births
21st-century American judges
Chief Justices of the Supreme Court of Virginia
Harvard University alumni
Justices of the Supreme Court of Virginia
Living people
People from Southampton County, Virginia
University of Virginia School of Law alumni
Virginia lawyers
Virginia state court judges
Virginia circuit court judges